Marcelo Reitz (born: 21 December 1963) is a sailor from Florianópolis, Brazil. who represented his country at the 1996 Summer Olympics in Savannah, United States as crew member in the Soling. With helmsman Daniel Glomb and fellow crew member Edson de Araújo, Jr. they took the 21st place.

References

Living people
1963 births
Sailors at the 1996 Summer Olympics – Soling
Olympic sailors of Brazil
Sportspeople from Florianópolis
Brazilian male sailors (sport)